Tommaso Temanza (9 March 1705 – 14 June 1789) was an Italian architect and author of the Neoclassic period. Born in Venice, he  was active both in his natal city and the mainland towns of the Republic of Venice.

Biography

His family held bureaucratic posts for the city of Venice. He studied in Padua with the mathematician and professor Giovanni Poleni. He apprenticed as an architect under  his uncle, Giovanni Antonio Scalfarotto. He helped train Matteo Lucchesi, the uncle of Piranesi. One of his first jobs was as a proto or chief architecture for the Magistrate of the waterways, a position also held by Lucchesi.  Among his works include the church of Santa Margherita (circa 1748) in Padua; the private chapel on the grounds of Villa Contarini located in Piazzola sul Brenta; and a loggia for Ca' Zenobio in Venice. His masterpieces are however for churches in Venice, including the cylindrical church of Santa Maria Maddalena (where his remains rest), the church of San Servolo and the chapel Sagredo in San Francesco della Vigna. The abandoned project for the facade of Ca' Sagredo in Venice.

He is best known for his 1778 biography of architects from Venice: Vite dei più celebri architetti e scrittori veneziani. In 1762, he also wrote a biography of Andrea Palladio (Vita di Andrea Palladio).

Works

Sources 
Bibliography

Notes

1705 births
1789 deaths
18th-century Italian architects
Italian art historians
Republic of Venice architects